Zasadi is a small settlement in the Municipality of Križevci in northeastern Slovenia. The area is part of the traditional region of Styria. The entire municipality is now included in the Mura Statistical Region.

A small Neo-Gothic chapel-shrine in the settlement was built in 1940 and restored in 1994.

References

External links
Zasadi on Geopedia

Populated places in the Municipality of Križevci